Mohammad Rajeh Khamees (born January 28, 1981) is a retired Jordanian football player who currently played as a defender.

Honors and Participation in International Tournaments

In WAFF Championships 
2007 WAFF Championship
2008 WAFF Championship

External links 
 
 

1981 births
Living people
Jordanian footballers
Jordan international footballers
Association football defenders
Al-Hazem F.C. players
Al-Faisaly SC players
Sportspeople from Amman
Saudi Professional League players
Fujairah FC players
Jordanian Pro League players
UAE First Division League players
Jordanian expatriate footballers
Jordanian expatriate sportspeople in Saudi Arabia
Jordanian expatriate sportspeople in the United Arab Emirates
Expatriate footballers in Saudi Arabia
Expatriate footballers in the United Arab Emirates